360 is a 2011 internationally produced drama thriller film directed by Fernando Meirelles and written by Peter Morgan as a loose adaptation of  Arthur Schnitzler's 1897 play Reigen. The film stars an ensemble cast of Anthony Hopkins, Ben Foster, Rachel Weisz, Jude Law and other international actors. Following the stories of couples and their sexual encounters, 360 was selected to open the 2011 London Film Festival. Magnolia Pictures released the film on video on demand on 29 June 2012 and was released  in United States theaters on 3 August 2012. The film reunited Weisz and director Meirelles, who worked together on The Constant Gardener.

Plot

Vienna
Anna accompanies her sister Mirka to a nude photo-shoot for an escort agency, run by Rocco. Mirka chooses the professional name 'Blanca', and Rocco reveals he murdered a wealthy client, splitting his money with the escort who tipped him off. Anna waits downstairs while Mirka performs a “personal favor” for Rocco, and the sisters return to Bratislava by bus.

Rocco calls Mirka to meet a client named Michael Daly, and Anna accompanies her to Vienna. When one of Michael's associates loudly debates whether Mirka is a prostitute, Michael walks out, and leaves his wife multiple affectionate voicemails. Returning to his hotel, he receives a call from his associate, who talked to Blanca and blackmails Michael into a business deal.

Paris
An Algerian man spies on a woman wearing a red beret, on her way to the airport. It is clear he has feelings for her he cannot express. He talks to an imam, but continues to follow the married woman, and goes to his mosque and a therapist for advice.

London
Rose walks to a hotel, unaware a distraught woman is taking pictures of her. Rose meets Rui, and tells him they must end their affair, but they have sex. Returning home, Rui discovers his girlfriend Laura has left him, leaving him a video that reveals she was the woman photographing Rose. Michael Daly returns home, revealing he is married to Rose, and they attend their daughter's school play. In bed, Rose recalls Michael's voicemails, and when he mentions his next trip may be to Berlin, Rose exclaims that she would love to go.

Colorado
Sex offender Tyler, released after six years in prison, fears he is not ready to face the temptations outside. Boarding a flight home to Brazil, Laura chats with fellow passenger John, who is searching for his long-missing daughter, and they are stranded in Denver by bad weather. Tyler speaks on the phone with his social worker about his uncontrollable attractions, and encounters Laura in an airport restaurant. She invites him to her hotel room, but Tyler rebuffs her intoxicated advances and locks himself in the bathroom.

The next day, John finds Laura, and is moved when she hugs him before parting ways. John arrives in Phoenix to examine unidentified remains, which turn out not to be his daughter. At an Alcoholics Anonymous meeting, John declares that he can finally accept his daughter's unknown fate and move on.

At the meeting, Valentina (Dinara Drukarova) shares her own story, revealing she is the woman the Algerian man spied on in Paris. She plans to divorce her husband Sergei, who is consumed with working for a crooked Russian businessman, and she is secretly in love with her boss.

Back in Paris
Returning home, Valentina tells Sergei she wants a divorce and is interested in someone else, but Sergei ignores her and leaves. Valentina arrives for work at a dental office, where her boss is the Algerian man. They repress their feelings for each other, and he tells her she should find another job; both are heartbroken as she leaves.

Back in Vienna
Sergei picks up his boss, who reprimands him for studying English. Mirka and Anna arrive in Vienna, and Sergei sends Mirka to his boss' hotel room. Anna and Sergei bond over their mutual love for books and learning English, and she persuades him to drive them around the city.

At the hotel, Sergei’s boss shows Mirka a briefcase of cash, and she texts Rocco. While Mirka performs fellatio, Sergei's boss reads her phone; realizing she plans to rob him, he knocks her unconscious and calls Sergei. Returning to the hotel, Sergei finds himself in the elevator with Rocco. Leaving as Rocco attacks the boss, Sergei drives away with Anna. Regaining consciousness, Mirka takes the money and leaves. In voiceover, Anna reads a farewell letter to her sister.

Berlin
Michael walks through Berlin with his business associate, professing his love for his wife. They meet Rose, and she and Michael head to the airport arm-in-arm. The associate notices a woman walk into a building; she meets Rocco for a photo shoot.

Cast

Lucia Siposová as Mirka
Gabriela Marcinkova as Anna
Johannes Krisch as Rocco
Jude Law as Michael Daly
Moritz Bleibtreu as Salesman #1
Jamel Debbouze as Algerian Man
Dinara Drukarova as Valentina
Vladimir Vdovichenkov as Sergei
Rachel Weisz as Rose Daly
Juliano Cazarré as Rui
Maria Flor as Laura
Ben Foster as Tyler McGregor
Marianne Jean-Baptiste as Fran
Anthony Hopkins as John
Mark Ivanir as Sania
Danica Jurcova as Alina
Peter Morgan as Salesman #2
Riann Steele as Waitress
François-Xavier Demaison as Taxi Driver
Patty Hannock as Psychiatrist
Djemel Barak as Imam
Chipo Chung as Editor
Sydney Wade as Ellie
Byrd Wilkins as Social Worker
Martin McDougall as Airport Policeman
Gerard Monaco as Airport Security Desk Official
Youssef Kerkour as Phoenix Policeman
Sean Power as AA Secretary
Christoph Zadra as Hotel Security Person
Tereza Srbova as European Girl
Giorgio Spiegelfeld as Photographer
Lisa Palfrey as Psychologist

Reception
On review aggregator Rotten Tomatoes, the film holds an approval rating of 20% based on 75 reviews, with an average rating of 4.43/10. The website's critics consensus reads: "Spreading itself thin across a sprawling narrative without a unifying focus, 360 just keeps running in circles." On Metacritic, the film has a weighted average score of 43 out of 100, based on 24 critics, indicating "mixed or average reviews".

Philip French in The Observer (London) concluded "360 has a gleaming surface and a knowing air, but essentially it reflects the lives of people who spend too much time in planes". Manohla Dargis in The New York Times says "There are moments in "360" that show what the movie might have been ... But the overshooting and overediting here suggest Mr. Meirelles, or maybe the producers, were trying to work around this story, instead of with it."

References

External links
 
 
 

French romantic drama films
British romantic drama films
Brazilian romantic drama films
Austrian romantic drama films
2011 films
2011 romantic drama films
Films directed by Fernando Meirelles
Films scored by Mark Orton
Films shot in London
Films shot in Paris
Films shot in Vienna
Films shot in Slovakia
Films shot in Minnesota
Films set in Colorado
Films set in London
Films set in Paris
Films set in Vienna
British films based on plays
Films based on works by Arthur Schnitzler
English-language French films
English-language Brazilian films
English-language Austrian films
Films set in Austria
2010s English-language films
2010s British films
2010s French films